Harry Frost (27 February 1869 – 6 July 1954) was an All Blacks rugby union player from New Zealand.  He was a forward.

He played one match for the All Blacks in 1896 against Queensland, when John (James) Swindley had to withdraw because of injury.

He played for Canterbury, and was a longterm sports administrator with the NZRFU (and the first New Zealand representative to become a life member, in 1939). He was born in Riccarton, Christchurch and died in Auckland.

Frost Road in Mount Roskill, Auckland, originally called Rugby Road, was named after him.

References

Bibliography
Palenski, R., Chester, R., and McMillan, N., (2005). The Encyclopaedia of New Zealand Rugby (4th ed.).  Auckland: Hodder Moa Beckett. 

1869 births
1954 deaths
New Zealand rugby union players
New Zealand international rugby union players
Rugby union forwards
Rugby union players from Christchurch